Scindapsus pictus, or silver vine, is a species of flowering plant in the arum family Araceae, native to India, Bangladesh, Thailand, Peninsular Malaysia, Borneo, Java, Sumatra, Sulawesi, and the Philippines.

The leaves are matte green and covered in silver blotches. The insignificant flowers are rarely seen in cultivation.

The Latin specific epithet pictus means "painted", referring to the variegation on the leaves.

The cultivar 'Argyraeus' has gained the Royal Horticultural Society's Award of Garden Merit.

References

Flora of Bangladesh
Flora of Thailand
Flora of Malesia
Flora of the Philippines
House plants
Monsteroideae
Plants described in 1842